Lorenzo Cecconi (13 August 1863 – April 1947) was an Italian painter, restorer, and curator.

Background
Born in Rome, Lorenzo Cecconi was the son of a painting restorer. He studied in Rome at the Accademia di San Luca, under the guidance of Aurelio Tiratelli. He painted in oil and watercolors, focusing on rural landscapes and figures, such as the Lavandaie di Ceccano, a painting that was exhibited at the Amatori e Cultori Society in Rome in 1886. He preferred the tonal range of greens and grays, to represent the light effect, a little melancholy, of the rain and the overcast sky. Among his works: Pineta di Ostia and Collection of Reeds.

1890: at the International Exhibition of the City of Rome some works by Lorenzo Cecconi, including Verso sera (painting which is considered his masterpiece) and Returning from the country, are noted by Giovanni Costa (called Nino). King Umberto I purchases one of his paintings.1900: his landscapes, The torrent and Autumn rain are exhibited at the Milan Triennale. 1901: his painting Between yes and no is exhibited at the Roman exhibition of the In arte libertas Association.1902: Farewell is exposed. In 1904, Cecconi entered the "XXV della Campagna Romana", with the nickname "Chanterelle".1913: When the stolen Mona Lisa was recovered in 1913, after having been taken from the Louvre some years earlier, Cecconi was called on by the Italian government to examine the picture and ascertain whether it had received any damage, giving Cecconi "a unique opportunity of knowing every detail of the Louvre picture".

As Curator
While Cecconi was serving as curator of the Academy of Santa Luca, he called at the Grand Hotel and spent a considerable time minutely examining the Isleworth Mona Lisa, finding of the painting that "this is an original of Leonardo: the 'morbidezza', the condition of the 'crepatura' are unique and exactly equivalent to that of the Louvre example". He later wrote a letter expanding on this assessment, stating:

From his long stay in India to carry out restorations, Cecconi reported studies of oriental taste that he exhibited at the Colonial Exhibition of 1934. He has also participated in exhibitions in Palermo, Naples, Berlin, Vienna, Barcelona and Chicago. He twice won the "Werstappen" landscape prize, offered by the Accademia di San Luca.

Restoration of Ajanta Ellora caves
During the  early 1920s, the Ajanta site was in the territory of the princely state of the Hyderabad, India. and (the last Nizam of Hyderabad) appointed experts to restore the artwork, converted the site into a museum and built a road to enable tourists come to the site.

The Nizam's Director of Archaeology obtained the services of Professor Lorenzo Cecconi, assisted by Count Orsini, to restore the paintings in the caves.  The Director of Archaeology for the last Nizam of Hyderabad said of the work of Cecconi and Orsini:

Bibliography 
Renato Mammucari, the 25th of the Roman countryside, Albano Laziale, Vela, 1984. Preface by Paolo Emilio Trastulli
Renato Mammucari, The painters of mal'aria: from the Roman countryside to the Pontine Marshes: views and customs of the Agro through the paintings of Italian and foreign artists who left their memory before the radical transformation of the environment and the territory, Rome, Newton & Compton, 1988. Co-author Rigel Langella.
Lando Scotoni, Geographical definition of the Roman countryside, in Acts of the Accademia Nazionale dei Lincei, Class of Moral, Historical and Philological Sciences, Rendiconti, series 9, v. 4, fasc. 4, 390 (1993).
Renato Mammucari, Roman countryside: geographical maps - perspective plans - panoramic views - picturesque costumes, Città di Castello, Edimond, 2002.
Renato Mammucari, the 25th of the Roman countryside: 1904-2004, Marigliano, LER, 2005.
Richard Cohen, Beyond Enlightenment: Buddhism, Religion, Modernity (2006), p. 51.

References

1863 births
1947 deaths
Italian painters
Painters from Rome
Curators from Rome